Tyler Hellard is a Canadian writer, whose debut novel Searching for Terry Punchout was shortlisted for the Amazon.ca First Novel Award and the Kobo Emerging Writer Prize in 2019.

Originally from Summerside, Prince Edward Island, Hellard graduated from St. Francis Xavier University. He is currently based in Calgary, Alberta.

References

External links

21st-century Canadian novelists
21st-century Canadian male writers
Canadian male novelists
St. Francis Xavier University alumni
People from Summerside, Prince Edward Island
Writers from Prince Edward Island
Writers from Calgary
Living people
Year of birth missing (living people)